A partial lunar eclipse took place on Thursday, March 2, 1961, the first of two partial lunar eclipses in 1961.

Visibility

Related lunar eclipses

Lunar year series

Saros series

Half-Saros cycle
A lunar eclipse will be preceded and followed by solar eclipses by 9 years and 5.5 days (a half saros). This lunar eclipse is related to two total solar eclipses of Solar Saros 139.

See also
List of lunar eclipses
List of 20th-century lunar eclipses

Notes

External links

1961-03
1961 in science
March 1961 events